The World Mycotoxin Journal is a peer-reviewed scientific journal covering mycotoxins. It is published by Wageningen Academic Publishers. It is indexed in the Journal Citation Reports.

External links 
 

Microbiology journals
English-language journals